The Austrian Federation of the Deaf (ÖGLB), German: Österreichischer Gehörlosenbund, is a national federation for the deaf in Austria.

It is affiliated to the World Federation of the Deaf (WFD) since 1951 and the European Union of the Deaf since 1995.
It was established in 1913. 
Its headquarters are in Vienna. 
The president is Helene Jarmer.

The Austrian Federation of the Deaf includes 2000 members.
The federation took his current name in 1985.

Presidents 
1913–1915 Karl Pawlek
1915–1917 Josef Pollanetz
1917–1919 Franz Wilhelm
1919–1921 Theodor Kratochwil
1921–1923 Georg Schwarzböck
1923–1926 Karl Pawlek
1926–1928 Theodor Kratochwil
1928–1938 Georg Schwarzböck
1940–1943 Karl Johann Brunner
1946–1949 Heinrich Prochazka
1949–1955 Karl Altenaichinger
1956–1960 Heinrich Prochazka
1960–1965 Karl Johann Brunner
1965–1970 Gerhard Schmidt
1970–1985 Willibald Tapler
1985–1997 Peter Dimmel
1997–2001 Trude Dimmel
2001–  Helene Jarmer

See also  
 Sign language
 Austrian Sign Language 
 Deaf culture

References

External links  
 Norwegian Federation of the Deaf (NDF) 
 

Disability organisations based in Austria
Deaf culture in Austria
Deafness organizations
1913 establishments in Austria